Ryan Harrison was the defending champion but chose not to defend his title.

Kei Nishikori won the title after defeating Mackenzie McDonald 6–1, 6–4 in the final.

Seeds

Draw

Finals

Top half

Bottom half

References
Main Draw
Qualifying Draw

RBC Tennis Championships of Dallas - Singles
2018 Singles